Saitissus is a monotypic genus of Papuan jumping spiders containing the single species, Saitissus squamosus. It was first described by Carl Friedrich Roewer in 1938, and is found only in Papua New Guinea. The genus name is derived from the similar genus Saitis. The species name is Latin for "scaly".

References

Arthropods of New Guinea
Monotypic Salticidae genera
Salticidae
Spiders of Asia
Taxa named by Carl Friedrich Roewer